Craig Payne (May 22, 1961 – April 7, 2017) was an American professional boxer who competed from 1985 to 2001, challenging for the IBO heavyweight title in 1992. As an amateur, he won the National Golden Gloves super heavyweight title in 1983.

Amateur career
Payne was a standout football player at Chillicothe (Ohio) High School, graduating in 1979. He moved to Livonia, Michigan, in July of that year and began boxing in order to lose weight. Payne won a gold medal at the 1982 National Sports Festival, followed by the National Golden Gloves title in 1983 after decisioning a young Mike Tyson.

Payne upset three-time Olympic champion Teófilo Stevenson en route to a gold medal at the 1983 North American Championships in Houston, Texas. At the Boxing World Cup held in Italy the following month, he took home the silver medal after losing to Francesco Damiani in the final.

Professional career
Payne made his professional debut in 1985, defeating Cleveland Ingram via second-round knockout in Detroit. However, he didn't compete for six years before returning in 1991, well past his prime. Payne's pro career was quite surprising largely because he was completely out of shape often coming in at 300 lbs. His least notable success was a KO of previously undefeated Samson Po'uha.

Professional boxing record

|-
|align="center" colspan=8|12 Wins (8 knockouts, 4 decisions), 20 Losses (7 knockouts, 13 decisions), 1 Draw 
|-
| align="center" style="border-style: none none solid solid; background: #e3e3e3"|Result
| align="center" style="border-style: none none solid solid; background: #e3e3e3"|Record
| align="center" style="border-style: none none solid solid; background: #e3e3e3"|Opponent
| align="center" style="border-style: none none solid solid; background: #e3e3e3"|Type
| align="center" style="border-style: none none solid solid; background: #e3e3e3"|Round
| align="center" style="border-style: none none solid solid; background: #e3e3e3"|Date
| align="center" style="border-style: none none solid solid; background: #e3e3e3"|Location
| align="center" style="border-style: none none solid solid; background: #e3e3e3"|Notes
|-align=center
|Loss
|align=left|
|align=left| Andre Purlette
|align=left|TKO
|align=left|2
|10/02/2001
|align=left| Miami, Florida, U.S.
|align=left|
|-
|Loss
|align=left|
|align=left| Anthony Curry
|UD
|6
|05/02/2000
|align=left| Rochester, Washington, U.S.
|align=left|
|-
|Loss
|
|align=left| Richard Mason
|UD
|6
|22/10/1999
|align=left| Rising Sun, Indiana, U.S.
|align=left|
|-
|Loss
|
|align=left| Fres Oquendo
|TKO
|3
|10/07/1999
|align=left| Elgin, Illinois, U.S.
|align=left|
|-
|Loss
|
|align=left| Troy Weida
|TKO
|5
|10/06/1999
|align=left| Indianapolis, Indiana, U.S.
|align=left|
|-
|Loss
|
|align=left| Tim Puller
|UD
|8
|01/05/1999
|align=left| Rochester, Washington, U.S.
|align=left|
|-
|Loss
|
|align=left| Iran Barkley
|MD
|8
|27/07/1996
|align=left| Rochester, Washington, U.S.
|align=left|
|-
|Loss
|
|align=left| James Tillis
|UD
|8
|21/06/1996
|align=left| Vancouver, Washington, U.S.
|align=left|
|-
|Loss
|
|align=left| Daniel Dăncuță
|KO
|6
|07/03/1995
|align=left| Prior Lake, Minnesota, U.S.
|align=left|
|-
|Loss
|
|align=left| Joe Thomas
|PTS
|4
|17/02/1995
|align=left| Atlantic City, New Jersey, U.S.
|align=left|
|-
|Loss
|
|align=left| Shannon Briggs
|UD
|8
|13/01/1995
|align=left| Atlantic City, New Jersey, U.S.
|align=left|
|-
|Loss
|
|align=left| Ray Anis
|TKO
|10
|01/10/1994
|align=left| Boston, Massachusetts, U.S.
|align=left|
|-
|Win
|
|align=left| Samson Po'uha
|TKO
|6
|30/06/1994
|align=left| Mesquite, Nevada, U.S.
|align=left|
|-
|Loss
|
|align=left| Mike Hunter
|PTS
|10
|19/05/1994
|align=left| North Las Vegas, Nevada, U.S.
|align=left|
|-
|Loss
|
|align=left| John Bray
|PTS
|8
|06/05/1994
|align=left| Terre Haute, Indiana, U.S.
|align=left|
|-
|Loss
|
|align=left| Darren Hayden
|PTS
|6
|09/03/1994
|align=left| Lexington, Kentucky, U.S.
|align=left|
|-
|Loss
|
|align=left| Francois Botha
|KO
|7
|30/10/1993
|align=left| Johannesburg, South Africa
|align=left|
|-
|Loss
|
|align=left| Garing Lane
|PTS
|10
|28/09/1993
|align=left| Bay Saint Louis, Mississippi, U.S.
|align=left|
|-
|Win
|align=left|
|align=left| Rocky Sekorski
|TKO
|6
|14/09/1993
|align=left| Atlantic City, New Jersey, U.S.
|align=left|
|-
|Win
|align=left|
|align=left| Melton Bowen
|TKO
|5
|28/08/1993
|align=left| Orlando, Florida, U.S.
|align=left|
|-
|Win
|
|align=left| Bobby Crabtree
|TKO
|6
|29/05/1993
|align=left| Yakima, Washington, U.S.
|align=left|
|-
|Win
|
|align=left| Tyrone Evans
|PTS
|6
|27/04/1993
|align=left| Auburn Hills, Michigan, U.S.
|align=left|
|-
|Loss
|
|align=left| Lionel Butler
|TKO
|7
|26/03/1993
|align=left| Reseda, California, U.S.
|align=left|
|-
|Loss
|
|align=left| Pinklon Thomas
|SD
|12
|14/11/1992
|align=left| Greenville, South Carolina, U.S.
|align=left|
|-
|Win
|
|align=left| Arthel Lawhorne
|TKO
|2
|27/10/1992
|align=left| Auburn Hills, Michigan, U.S.
|align=left|
|-
|Win
|
|align=left| Conroy Nelson
|KO
|6
|19/06/1992
|align=left| London, Ontario, Canada
|align=left|
|-
|Loss
|
|align=left| Tyrone Evans
|MD
|4
|21/04/1992
|align=left| Auburn Hills, Michigan, U.S.
|align=left|
|-
|Win
|
|align=left| Kevin P Porter
|PTS
|4
|08/02/1992
|align=left| Lansing, Michigan, U.S.
|align=left|
|-
|Win
|
|align=left| Luis Torres
|PTS
|4
|21/01/1992
|align=left| Canton, Michigan, U.S.
|align=left|
|- align=center
|style="background: #c5d2ea"|Draw
|align=left|
|align=left| Robert Smith
|align=left|PTS
|align=left|4
|09/12/1991
|align=left| Waukesha, Wisconsin, U.S.
|align=left|
|-
|Win
|
|align=left| Ken McCants
|KO
|3
|14/11/1991
|align=left| Auburn Hills, Michigan, U.S.
|align=left|
|-
|Win
|
|align=left| Kevin P Porter
|PTS
|4
|16/07/1991
|align=left| Lansing, Michigan, U.S.
|align=left|
|-
|Win
|
|align=left| Cleveland Ingram
|KO
|2
|21/03/1985
|align=left| Detroit, Michigan, U.S.
|align=left|
|}

References

External links
 

1961 births
2017 deaths
Heavyweight boxers
National Golden Gloves champions
American male boxers
Sportspeople from Chillicothe, Ohio
Sportspeople from Livonia, Michigan
Boxers from Ohio
Boxers from Michigan